Darrell Wilbert Allums, Jr. (born September 12, 1958) is an American retired basketball player. He played in the National Basketball Association (NBA) during the 1980–81 season with the Dallas Mavericks.

Basketball
Allums attended Lynwood High School, where his 18 points and 18 rebounds per game helped lead his team to the Southern Section 3A championship.

A 6'9" forward playing on scholarship for the UCLA Bruins men's basketball team, Allums played for three different coaches and ended his collegiate career by playing four minutes in UCLA's loss to the University of Louisville in the finals of the 1980 NCAA Men's Division I Basketball Tournament.

Allums was selected with the 11th pick in the fifth round of the 1980 NBA Draft by the Dallas Mavericks and played one season (1980–81) for them, averaging 2.7 points, 3.0 rebounds and 1.1 assist per game.

Later life
In 1989, Allums was sentenced to nine years in prison for robbing Domino's Pizza deliverymen on 14 separate occasions (he was convicted of eight counts with the other six charges dropped). During the trial the judge was sympathetic after it was brought out that Allums was fighting a cocaine habit.

References

External links
Career statistics

1958 births
Living people
American expatriate basketball people in the Philippines
American men's basketball players
American people convicted of robbery
American sportspeople convicted of crimes
Basketball players from Los Angeles
Dallas Mavericks draft picks
Dallas Mavericks players
Philippine Basketball Association imports
Power forwards (basketball)
Small forwards
UCLA Bruins men's basketball players
U/Tex Wranglers players